The Franklin Terrace Hotel is a historic hotel at 67 Harrison Avenue in Franklin, North Carolina.  The two story stuccoed-brick building was built in 1888, originally to serve as a girls boarding school.  In 1902 it began serving as a local public school, and in 1915 it was converted into a tourist hotel.  The building is T-shaped, with a three-bay central pavilion projecting from the main rectangular block.  A two-story wooden porch (probably added during the hotel conversion) wraps around this central pavilion, with massive square posts and a solid weatherboard balustrade.

The hotel was listed on the National Register of Historic Places in 1982.

See also
National Register of Historic Places listings in Macon County, North Carolina

References

Hotel buildings on the National Register of Historic Places in North Carolina
Italianate architecture in North Carolina
Hotel buildings completed in 1888
Buildings and structures in Macon County, North Carolina
National Register of Historic Places in Macon County, North Carolina
1888 establishments in North Carolina